An Iceland Fisherman (1886) is a novel by French author Pierre Loti. It depicts the romantic but inevitably sad life of Breton fishermen who sail each summer season to the stormy Iceland cod grounds. Literary critic Edmund Gosse characterized it as "the most popular and finest of all [Loti's] writings."

Loti's style is a combination of the French realist school, such as Émile Zola, and a form of literary impressionism. As Jules Cambon says, Loti wrote at a "..time when M. Zola and his school stood at the head of the literary movement. There breathed forth from Loti's writings an all-penetrating fragrance of poesy [poetry], which liberated French literary ideals from the heavy and oppressive yoke of the Naturalistic school." Loti uses a simple vocabulary, "but these words, as used by him, take on a value we did not know they possessed; they awaken sensations that linger deeply within us." The characters are humble and simple working-class people, the incidents are normal every day affairs, dealing with the themes of love and separation.

Loti's greatest strength is in the depictions of nature, placing it center stage, as Cambon says:

It was adapted for the stage by Louis Tiercelin with music by Guy Ropartz. Another work based on the same novel was the 30-minute symphonic poem Nordland-Rhapsodie (Nordic Rhapsody) for large orchestra written by Austrian composer Joseph Marx in 1929. The novel has been filmed three times, most notably in 1959 by French director Pierre Schoendoerffer.

It's also quoted and referenced as inspiration in the 2015 movie .

Footnotes

External links
Pierre Loti. An Iceland Fisherman. Translated from the French with a critical introd. by Jules Cambon. New York P.F. Collier. 1902. From Internet Archive.

  An Iceland Fisherman, audio version 
 

1886 French novels
French autobiographical novels
Novels by Pierre Loti
Fishing in Iceland
Novels set on ships
French novels adapted into films
French novels adapted into plays
Novels set in Brittany